Sunrunner may refer to:

Pontiac Sunrunner, a mini SUV produced for Chevrolet
Sunrunner's Fire, the third book in the Dragon Prince Trilogy by Melanie Rawn
SunRunner, the Bus Rapid Transit service offered by the Pinellas Suncoast Transit Authority
Sunrunner (Transformers), an autobot
Sunrunner, the name of the University of Michigan Solar Car Team's first car